Laura M. Murphy is a Democratic member of the Illinois Senate representing the 28th district since October 2015. The 28th district includes all or parts of Arlington Heights, Bartlett, Bloomingdale, Des Plaines, Elk Grove Village, Hanover Park, Hoffman Estates, Park Ridge, Roselle and Schaumburg.

She previously served as a member of the Des Plaines City Council.

As of July 2022, Senator Murphy is a member of the following Illinois Senate committees:

 (Chairwoman of) Appropriations - Constitutional Offices Committee (SAPP-SACO)
 Appropriations Committee (SAPP)
 Assignments Committee (SCOA)
 Commerce Committee (SCOM)
 Environment and Conservation Committee (SNVR)
 Executive Committee (SEXC)
 (Chairwoman of) Executive Appointments Committee (SEXA)
 (Chairwoman of) Executive - Elections Committee (SEXC-SEOE)
 Executive - Government Operations Committee (SEXC-SEGO)
 Financial Institutions Committee (SFIC)
 Higher Education Committee (SCHE)
 Labor Committee (SLAB)
 Local Government Committee (SLGV)
 Redistricting Committee (SRED)
 Redistricting - Northwest Cook County (SRED-SRNC)

References

External links
Biography, bills and committees at the 99th Illinois General Assembly
By session: 99th
Senator Murphy's constituent services website

Living people
People from Des Plaines, Illinois
Illinois city council members
Democratic Party Illinois state senators
Women state legislators in Illinois
Women city councillors in Illinois
21st-century American politicians
21st-century American women politicians
Year of birth missing (living people)